Malton, also called New Malton, was a constituency of the House of Commons of the Parliament of England in 1295 and 1298, and again from 1640, then of the Parliament of Great Britain from 1707 to 1800 and of the Parliament of the United Kingdom from 1801 to 1885. It was represented by two Members of Parliament until 1868, among them the political philosopher Edmund Burke, and by one member from 1868 to 1885.

The constituency was divided between the new Thirsk and Malton division of the North Riding of Yorkshire and the Buckrose division of the East Riding of Yorkshire from 1885.

Boundaries
The constituency consisted of parts of the St Leonard's and St Michael's parishes of New Malton in the North Riding until the Great Reform Act of 1832; the borough at that point included 791 houses and had a population of 4,173 in the 1831 census. The Reform Act expanded the boundaries to include the whole of those two parishes, as well as that of Old Malton and of the adjoining town of Norton in the East Riding, increasing the population to 7,192 and encompassing 1,401 houses.

Franchise
The right of election in Malton was vested in the scot and lot householders of the borough, of whom there were about 800 in 1832. In practice the seats were generally in the gift of the landowner, Earl Fitzwilliam (and were frequently held by one of that family, often by the heir to the Earldom who had the courtesy title Viscount Milton); at an earlier period the borough was similarly dominated by the Watson-Wentworth family, and was used as a form of government patronage when the Marquess of Rockingham was Prime Minister.

Members of Parliament
New Malton re-enfranchised by Parliament in November 1640

MPs 1640–1868

MPs 1868–1885

Election results

Elections in the 1830s

Scarlett resigned, causing a by-election.

Cavendish resigned, causing a by-election.

Pepys was appointed as Solicitor General for England and Wales, requiring a by-election.

Pepys was appointed as First Lord Commissioner for the Custody of the Great Seal, requiring a by-election.

Pepys resigned after being appointed as Lord Chancellor and being elevated to the peerage, becoming 1st Earl of Cottenham, requiring a by-election.

Ramsden's death caused a by-election.

Elections in the 1840s

Childers resigned by accepting the office of Steward of the Chiltern Hundreds, causing a by-election.

Elections in the 1850s

Elections in the 1860s

Seat reduced to one member

Elections in the 1870s

Elections in the 1880s

Notes 
Footnotes

Citations

References
Michael Brock, The Great Reform Act (London: Hutchinson, 1973)
D Brunton & D H Pennington, “Members of the Long Parliament” (London: George Allen & Unwin, 1954)
Cobbett's Parliamentary history of England, from the Norman Conquest in 1066 to the year 1803 (London: Thomas Hansard, 1808) 
F W S Craig, "British Parliamentary Election Results 1832-1885" (2nd edition, Aldershot: Parliamentary Research Services, 1989)
J Holladay Philbin, "Parliamentary Representation 1832 - England and Wales" (New Haven: Yale University Press, 1965)
Henry Stooks Smith, "The Parliaments of England from 1715 to 1847" (2nd edition, edited by FWS Craig - Chichester: Parliamentary Reference Publications, 1973)
Robert Walcott, "English Politics in the Early Eighteenth Century" (Oxford: Oxford University Press, 1956)
Frederic A Youngs, jr, "Guide to the Local Administrative Units of England, Vol II" (London: Royal Historical Society, 1991)

History of North Yorkshire
Parliamentary constituencies in Yorkshire and the Humber (historic)
Constituencies of the Parliament of the United Kingdom established in 1640
Constituencies of the Parliament of the United Kingdom disestablished in 1885
Malton, North Yorkshire